The 2003 Barangay Ginebra Kings season was the 25th season of the franchise in the Philippine Basketball Association (PBA).

Draft picks

Transactions

Occurrences
Barangay Ginebra was coming off a three-game losing streak when they defeated Talk 'N Text, 122–117 in double overtime on March 21, with Eric Menk scoring a personal high 45 points while TNT rookie Jimmy Alapag scored 40 points. That game was forfeited and ordered replayed upon protest by the Phone Pals as Barangay Ginebra failed to free itself from a three-game slide.

Roster

Game results

All-Filipino Cup

References

Barangay Ginebra San Miguel seasons
Barangay